Chaqu may refer to:

Chaqu-ye Akhvani
Chaqu-ye Bala